Kentucky Route 1245 (KY 1245) is a  state highway in Ohio County that begins at U.S. Route 62 (US 62) in Rockport and heads to Echols, where it meets the eastern terminus of KY 2719 (Echols Church Lane). It then turns from Pond Run Church Road (Old Junction of KY 176).  Also, where it was over the Western Kentucky Parkway heading to the western part of Nineteen School Road (County road 1263, CR 1263). The highway again goes over the Western Kentucky Parkway and meets the northern terminus of KY 2720 (Happy Hollow Road). Heading up north, it enters the town of McHenry, where it ends at US 62 and KY 2670.

Major intersections

References

1245
Transportation in Ohio County, Kentucky